The Indian locomotive class WCP-4 is a class of 1.5 kV DC electric locomotives that was developed in late 1920s by Swiss Locomotive and Machine Works (SLM)  for Indian Railways. The model name stands for broad gauge (W), Direct Current (C), Passenger traffic (P) engine, 1st generation (1). They entered service in 1930. A single WCP-4 was built at England between 1928 and 1929.

The WCP-4 served both passenger trains for over 40 years. With the introduction of more modern types of locomotives  and 25 KV AC electrification, all were withdrawn by early 1960s. Today the locomotives is scrapped.

History 
GIPR ordered the following test locomotives in 1923,Electrification of the GIPR began in 1922. Powerful locomotives were required to transport the express trains on the mountain railway to overcome the Western Ghats. They also had to be able to reach speeds of 85 miles an hour (137 km / h). Three test locomotives were therefore ordered from different manufacturers in order to be able to select a suitable design for the series. The tender and evaluation was monitored by the English electrical engineering firm Merz & McLellan in London. The EA / 1 emerged as the best locomotive from the evaluation, so that 21 more vehicles of this type were ordered. The locomotive is believed to have been scrapped in the 1960s.

See also 

Rail transport in India#History
Indian Railways
Locomotives of India
Rail transport in India

References

Books

External links
http://www.irfca.org/faq/faq-specs.html#WCP-1

India railway fan club

Electric locomotives of India
1500 V DC locomotives
Railway locomotives introduced in 1928
5 ft 6 in gauge locomotives
SLM locomotives